Kakas is a surname. Notable people with the surname include:

Gyula Kakas (1876–1928), Hungarian gymnast
Juraj Kakaš (born 1971), Slovak footballer

Surnames from nicknames